Zenab (also Romanized as Zenāb; also known as Zenyāb, Zinab, and Zīnat) is a village in Sanjabad-e Jonubi Rural District, Firuz District, Kowsar County, Ardabil Province, Iran. At the 2006 census, its population was 108, in 18 families.

References 

Towns and villages in Kowsar County